Svetlana Ussova (born 4 November 1999) is a Kazakh canoeist. She competed in the 2020 Summer Olympics.

References

1999 births
Living people
Kazakhstani female canoeists
Olympic canoeists of Kazakhstan
Canoeists at the 2020 Summer Olympics
Sportspeople from Almaty
Canoeists at the 2018 Asian Games
21st-century Kazakhstani women